Nanaimo is the same of several Canadian federal and British Columbia provincial electoral districts, both historical and current, in and around the Vancouver Island city of Nanaimo, British Columbia, Canada. Ridings "descended" from the original Nanaimo riding are also listed.

Federal

Current
Nanaimo—Ladysmith, federal electoral district since 2015

Historical
Nanaimo—Cowichan—The Islands, federal electoral district 1968-1976
Nanaimo (electoral district), federal electoral district 1903-1962
Nanaimo—Alberni, federal electoral district 1976-1987; 1996-2015
Nanaimo—Cowichan, federal electoral district 1987-2015

Provincial

Current
Nanaimo (provincial electoral district) 1996–present
Nanaimo-North Cowichan

Historical
Nanaimo City, provincial electoral district 1890-1912
Nanaimo (provincial electoral district), provincial electoral district 1871-1928
Nanaimo and The Islands 1941-1963
South Nanaimo
North Nanaimo
Nanaimo-Parksville 2001-2008
The Islands 1903-1937
Newcastle (electoral district) 1916
Cowichan-Newcastle

Nanaimo riding did not appear in the 1909 election, but Nanaimo City and The Islands were the Nanaimo-area ridings in the 1909 or 1912 election. The riding of Newcastle appeared in the 1916 election, as did The Islands.  For the 1924 election parts of Newcastle (electoral district) helped form the new riding of Cowichan-Newcastle.

Nanaimo also did not appear in a riding name in the 1933 or 1937 elections. In 1937 the name The Islands was restored.

References
Electoral History of BC, BC Elections

Politics of Nanaimo
Nanaimo